Nistru may refer to:

the Romanian and Moldovan name for the river Dniester
Nistru (Someș), a river in Maramureș County, Romania
Nistru, a village in the town Tăuții-Măgherăuș, Maramureș County, Romania